American actor and comedian Bill Murray has been known for not having an agent or manager. The only way he accepts role offers is by responding at random to messages from an unlisted toll-free telephone number which he created.  This arrangement has made it difficult for filmmakers to contact Murray and cast him in their films.  As a result, Murray has gained a reputation for missing out on a number of opportunities to portray certain characters in films he was considered to appear in.  The following is a list of films Murray turned down or missed out on.

List

Notes

 Murray did a cameo in the film The Jerk (1979) in which he portrayed a "flamboyantly gay decorator" but the scene was cut from the final film.

 The film Legal Eagles (1986) was initially intended as a two-man vehicle for Murray and Dustin Hoffman.  After both actors turned down the project, the character Murray was considered to play was then rewritten as a woman which ended up being portrayed by Debra Winger.

 According to several sources, Murray was considered to play Charlie Babbitt in the film Rain Man (1988).  However, a source from Business Insider claimed that Murray was considered for the part of Raymond Babbitt.

 After Murray declined to reprise his role in Charlie's Angels: Full Throttle (2003), the character Jimmy Bosley, portrayed by Bernie Mac, was then created as a replacement for John Bosley.

 It is known that Murray declined a supporting role in the film The Ice Harvest (2005), but sources differ as to which role he was offered.  A source from Vulture.com claimed he was considered for the part of Bill Guerrard whereas a source from Mental Floss claimed he was considered for that of Pete Van Hueten.

 Robert Downey Jr. claimed that Murray was considered for a part in the film Iron Man (2008) but did not specify which role he was offered to play.

References

Lists of films
Bill Murray